Giulia Farnese (1474 – 23 March 1524) was an Italian noblewoman, a mistress to Pope Alexander VI, and the sister of Pope Paul III. Known as Giulia la bella, meaning "Julia the beautiful" in Italian, Giulia was a member of the noble Farnese family, who were prominent leaders in the Italian regions of Parma and Piacenza. After marrying into the noble Orsini family in the Papal States, Giulia soon acquainted herself with, and initiated an affair with, the Spanish Cardinal Rodrigo de Borja. When the cardinal was elected Pope, Giulia continued the increasingly advantageous liaison, which enabled her to have her brother Alessandro made a cardinal, until losing Alexander's favor at the turn of the century.

Giulia spent most of her later years governing the castle of Carbognano, previously a property which Alexander had given to her husband. She died in 1524 in Rome at the residence belonging to Alessandro, who would later be elected Pope Paul III.

Lorenzo Pucci described her as "most lovely to behold". Cesare Borgia, the son of Alexander VI, described her as having "dark colouring, black eyes, round face and a particular ardor".

Biography

Family 
Giulia Farnese was born in Canino, then within the Papal States, to Pier Luigi Farnese, Signore di Montalto (1435–1487), and his wife, Giovanna Caetani. One earlier member of the Caetani dynasty was Pope Boniface VIII (1294–1303). Giulia had four siblings. Her oldest brother, Alessandro, was a notary who embarked on an ecclesiastical career. Her second brother, Bartolomeo, became Lord of Montalto in Alessandro's place, married Iolanda Monaldeschi, and had issue. Her third brother, Angelo, was a lord, married Lella Orsini, and had female issue. Her other sibling was a sister, Girolama.

At the age of fourteen, Giulia was sent to Rome by her mother in order to complete an education in the hopes of integrating herself into the Roman aristocracy.

First marriage and papal concubinage 

On 21 May 1489, Giulia married Orsino Orsini in Rome (the signing of the marriage contract had taken place the previous day). Her dowry for the match was 3,000 gold florins (around 500,000 USD). Orsini, who was described as being squint-eyed and devoid of any meaningful self-confidence, was the son of Adriana de Mila, a third cousin of Cardinal Rodrigo Borgia, who was then Vice-Chancellor of the Church. According to Maria Bellonci, it is uncertain when Rodrigo Borgia (Pope Alexander VI) fell in love with Giulia and decided to make her his mistress. What is known is that Adriana de Mila eventually gave her approval to Rodrigo Borgia and Giulia Farnese's relationship in order to win a higher status for her son within the Vatican. By November 1493, Giulia was living with Adriana de Mila and the Pope's daughter Lucrezia Borgia, who she became a friend of, in a recently built palace next to the Vatican from where the Pope could easily make his clandestine visits. The affair was widely rumored among gossips of the time, and Giulia was referred to as "the Pope's whore" or sarcastically as "the bride of Christ". However, writers like Michael de la Bedoyere dispute her alleged status as mistress.

Giulia enriched herself as a result of her relationship with the Pope. For instance, Lorenzo Pucci noted in 1494 that "she has an intent goldsmith that makes rings for one thousand ducati." Through her intimacy with the Pope, Giulia was able to get her brother Alessandro (the future Pope Paul III) created Cardinal in 1493. Even so, Alessandro had a precarious financial situation. Records from the Apostolic Chamber from autumn of 1500 put Alessandro's annual income at just two thousand ducats, making him one of the poorest members of the Sacred College. Consequently, Giulia almost certainly helped sustain her brother financially, enabling him to purchase Cardinal Pedro Ferris' Roman palace in early 1495 for 5,500 ducats - a purchase otherwise outside of Alessandro's means.

On 30 November 1492 Giulia gave birth to a baby girl who was named Laura. It is not clear whether Laura's father was Orsino or Alexander. Maria Bellonci believes that there is evidence that she did have a physical relationship with her husband. Whatever the case may be, Giulia claimed that Laura was indeed the Pope's daughter, but this may have been to raise the status of the child for future marriage considerations. In 1494, she angered the Pope by setting off to Capodimonte to be at the deathbed of her brother Angelo. She remained away from Rome, even after her brother's death, at the insistence of her husband. He eventually capitulated to papal pressure, however, and she soon set off on the journey back to her lover. This occurred at the same time as the French invasion of Italy under Charles VIII. Giulia was captured by the French captain Yves d’Allegre, who demanded from the Pope, and received, a ransom of 3,000 scudi for her safe conduct to Rome.

Giulia remained close to the Pope until 1499 or 1500. At this time, she seems to have fallen out of his favour due to her age (25 or 26). Bellonci believes that the break between the two was probably made amicably with the help of Adriana de Mila. Her husband Orsino also died prematurely in 1500. She then moved to Carbognano, which is not far from Rome. This town's castle had been given to Orsino by Alexander VI.

Second marriage and later life 

Giulia returned to Rome in 1505 for the wedding of her daughter Laura to Niccolò Franciotti della Rovere, Lord of Gallese, who was the brother of Cardinal Galeotto Franciotti della Rovere and the son of Laura della Rovere, sister of the then-incumbent Pope Julius II. For Giulia, the time of love was not over. In the first years of her widowhood, after a series of lovers whose names have not been recorded, she married Baron Giovanni Capece Bozzuto di Afragola, a member of the lower ranking Neapolitan nobility. In 1506, Giulia became the governor of Carbognano. Giulia took up residence in the citadel of the castle; years later, her name was inscribed on its gate. The chronicle of the castle states that Giulia was an able administrator who governed in a firm and energetic manner. Giulia stayed in Carbognano until 1522; she then returned to Rome.

Death 
In early 1524, Giulia, apparently sensing that death was near, had her testament written on the 14th of March in her room, overlooking the church of San Girolamo, in the Arenula district of Rome. Giulia died there, in the house of her brother, Cardinal Alessandro. She was 50 years old. The cause of her death is unknown. Ten years later her brother ascended the papal throne as Pope Paul III. Laura and Niccolò had two children, a son Giulio (d. 1550) and a daughter Lavinia (1521 - 1601), who inherited the possessions of the Orsini family.

In popular culture
In the 2011 Showtime television series The Borgias, Giulia is played by Lotte Verbeek.

In the 2011 Canal+ television series Borgia, Giulia is played by Marta Gastini.

Giulia is the protagonist of Kate Quinn's book series, The Borgia Chronicles.

Ancestry

Notes

References

Sources

Further reading

 
 
 
 

1474 births
1524 deaths
People from the Province of Viterbo
Giulia Farnese
Papal mistresses
15th-century Italian women
16th-century Italian women
Pope Alexander VI
Renaissance women